Zara Nelsova (December 23, 1918October 10, 2002) was a prominent cellist.

Biography
Nelsova was born as Sara Katznelson in Winnipeg, Canada, to parents of Jewish-Russian descent. Nelsova first performed at the age of five in Winnipeg. She eventually moved with her family to London, England, where she studied at the London Cello School with its principal, Herbert Walenn. She was heard by Sir John Barbirolli and introduced by him to Pablo Casals from whom she received additional lessons. In 1932, aged only 13, she gave a London debut recital and appeared as soloist with Sir Malcolm Sargent and the London Symphony Orchestra. During World War II she was principal cellist of the Toronto Symphony Orchestra and in 1942 made her United States solo debut at Town Hall in New York. From 1942 to 1944, she was cellist of the Conservatory String Quartet.

In 1949 Nelsova moved to London, where she introduced to Britain new works by Samuel Barber, Paul Hindemith, Dmitri Shostakovich and Ernest Bloch, who dedicated his three suites for unaccompanied cello to her. She premiered Hugh Wood's concerto at the 1969 Promenade concerts. In 1955 she became an American citizen and performed as a soloist for major orchestras, including Boston, Winnipeg, Montreal and the New York Philharmonic. She also toured extensively, and in 1966 was the first North American cellist to play in the Soviet Union. Nelsova promoted the Elgar Cello Concerto when it was rarely heard, long before Jacqueline du Pré, in concert and in recital with a piano reduction of the orchestral score. From 1966 to 1973 she was married to the American pianist Grant Johannesen, with whom she often performed and recorded. Her dignified, introspective readings of Bloch's Schelomo and Barber's Cello Concerto were both recorded with the composers conducting and later recorded Schelomo under Ernest Ansermet, also for the Decca-London label.) 

She played a Stradivari cello, the "Marquis de Corberon" of 1726.  She taught at the Juilliard School from 1962 to 2002, the year of her death. In 1978, Gerhard Samuel composed "In Memoriam DQ" for Solo Cello (copyright 1990 MMB Music), for Zara Nelsova, which was first performed January 7, 1980.

In 2002, Nelsova died in New York City, aged 83.

Zara Nelsova Award for Emerging Cellist
An award was given in Nelsova's name at the 2008 Naumburg International Violoncello Competition; the winner was Saeunn Thorsteinsdottir, from Iceland. At the 2011 International Cello Festival of Canada an award in her name was presented to Se-Doo Park.

References

Elgar Concerto: Recital, Eaton Auditorium, Toronto, ca 1955.

External links
Canadian Encyclopedia entry
 Photo with Grant Johannesen on concert tour of Southern Africa 1967, organised by Hans Adler.
[ allmusic.com Entry]

1918 births
2002 deaths
Canadian classical cellists
American classical cellists
American women classical cellists
Canadian expatriates in England
Canadian emigrants to the United States
Canadian music educators
Musicians from Winnipeg
Jewish Canadian musicians
Juilliard School faculty
20th-century American musicians
20th-century classical musicians
Canadian people of Russian-Jewish descent
American people of Russian-Jewish descent
20th-century Canadian women musicians
Women music educators
20th-century American women musicians
20th-century cellists